"" is the thirteenth Japanese single release from Hitomi Yaida. It is also the third single released from the album Here Today – Gone Tomorrow.

This track featured on the closing credits to the localised version of the motion picture Robots, with film clips appearing in the PV.

The limited edition CD-Extra release included the PV for Mawaru Sora.

The single reached number 15 in the Oricon charts on July 16, 2005.

Track listing

Notes

2005 singles
Hitomi Yaida songs
2005 songs
Songs written by Hitomi Yaida
Japanese film songs
Songs written for animated films